Arly Hanks is a 1993 American television pilot based on the first book of Joan Hess's series Malice in Maggody. Written by Sean Clark and directed by Arlene Sanford, it screened on CBS on August 20, 1994. Due to low ratings, the show was removed from the CBS season. Filmed in Atlanta, Georgia, the plot centered on Arly Hanks (Kate Jackson) who, after divorcing her husband, leaves her life in New York City and returns to her small hometown of Maggody, Arkansas. She becomes Sheriff of Maggody and deals  with mischievous residents while solving mysteries.

Cast
Kate Jackson as Arly Hanks
Ron Perlman as Jim-Bob Buchanan
Polly Bergen as Ruby Bee
Olivia Cole as Estelle
Ray McKinnon as Hobert Middleton
Nancy Youngblut as Miz Middleton
Raynor Scheine as Raz Buchanan
Harrison Page as Larry-Joe
Chambers Stevens as Kevin
Patrika Darbo as Dahlia O'Neill
Julie McCullough as Jay Lee

References

External links

Television pilots not picked up as a series
1993 television specials
1990s American television specials